The Ridgeway is a ridgeway or ancient trackway described as Britain's oldest road. The section clearly identified as an ancient trackway extends from Wiltshire along the chalk ridge of the Berkshire Downs to the River Thames at the Goring Gap, part of the Icknield Way which ran, not always on the ridge, from Salisbury Plain to East Anglia. The route was adapted and extended as a National Trail, created in 1972. The Ridgeway National Trail follows the ancient Ridgeway from Overton Hill, near Avebury, to Streatley, then follows footpaths and parts of the ancient Icknield Way through the Chiltern Hills to Ivinghoe Beacon in Buckinghamshire.

History

For at least 5,000 years travellers have used the Ridgeway.  The Ridgeway provided a reliable trading route to the Dorset coast and to the Wash in Norfolk. The high dry ground made travel easy and provided a measure of protection by giving traders a commanding view, warning against potential attacks. The Bronze Age saw the development of Uffington White Horse and the stone circle at Avebury. During the Iron Age, inhabitants took advantage of the high ground by building hillforts along the Ridgeway to help defend the trading route. Following the collapse of Roman authority in Western Europe, invading Saxon and Viking armies used it. In medieval times and later, the Ridgeway found use by drovers, moving their livestock from the West Country and Wales to markets in the Home Counties and London. Before the Enclosure Acts of 1750, the Ridgeway existed as an informal series of tracks across the chalk downs, chosen by travellers based on path conditions. Once enclosures started, the current path developed through the building of earth banks and the planting of hedges.

National Trail

The idea for a long-distance path along the line of the Wessex Downs and Chilterns goes back to the Hobhouse Committee of 1947.  The present route was designated by the Government in 1972, and opened as a National Trail in 1973.

At Marlborough it meets the Wessex Ridgeway, a footpath opened in 1994 which follows the southwest section of the ancient track into Dorset, as far as Lyme Regis. At Ivinghoe Beacon the Ridgeway meets the Icknield Way Path which continues northeast towards Suffolk. The Ridgeway meets the more recent (1997) Thames Path National Trail at the Goring Gap, where the trails use opposite banks of the River Thames between Goring-on-Thames and Mongewell; the Thames Path follows the western bank and the Ridgeway the eastern.

The official guide to the trail divides The Ridgeway into six sections. It is possible to join or leave the trail at other locations with public transport links including Avebury, Swindon, Wantage, Wallingford, Princes Risborough and Tring.

The Ridgeway is one of four long-distance footpaths that combine to run from Lyme Regis to Hunstanton, collectively referred to as the Greater Ridgeway or Greater Icknield Way.

The Ridgeway passes near many Neolithic, Iron Age and Bronze Age sites including Avebury Stone Circle; Barbury Castle, Liddington Castle, Uffington Castle, Segsbury Castle, Pulpit Hill and Ivinghoe Beacon Hill, all Iron Age and Bronze Age hill forts; Wayland's Smithy, a Neolithic chieftain burial tomb; the Uffington White Horse, an ancient  chalk horse carved into the hillside near Uffington Castle; and Grim's Ditch, a  section of earthwork near Mongewell created by Iron Age peoples as a possible demarcation line. Other points of interest include the Blowing Stone and Victory Drive, the private drive of Chequers (the British Prime Minister's country retreat).

The Ridgeway's surface varies from chalk-rutted farm paths and green lanes (which have a propensity for becoming extremely muddy and pot-holed after rain) to small sections of metalled roads. Designated as a bridleway (shared with horses and bicycles) for much of its length, the Ridgeway also includes parts designated as byway which permits the use of motorised vehicles. Local restrictions along many byway sections limit the use of motorised vehicles to the summer months. Under the Countryside and Rights of Way Act 2000, many public rights of way in England and Wales that authorities had not explicitly classified as Bridleway or Byway defaulted to the classification "Restricted Byway" which precludes the use of motor vehicles at all times, except authorised vehicles and where required for access. As a result, much of the Ridgeway remains prohibited to motor vehicle use by the general public year-round. However, the Ridgeway is the only means of access for many farms, especially in the more remote parts of the Downs.

Despite the Ridgeway's artificial creation, the TV programme Seven Natural Wonders featured it in 2005 as one of the wonders of the South.

Places along the Ridgeway 
Places that are near (or on) the Ridgeway National Trail include (from west to east):

References

Maps 
Annotated map of the Ridgeway
Ridgeway National Trail. Published by Harvey Maps, UK.

External links
 The Ridgeway official site
 BBC description of the Ridgeway
 The Ridgeway on Google Maps
 The Ridgeway map detailed in 2 mile sections

Ancient trackways in England
Footpaths in Wiltshire
Geography of Oxfordshire
Geography of Berkshire
Geography of Buckinghamshire
Archaeological sites in Wiltshire
Archaeological sites in Oxfordshire
Archaeological sites in Berkshire
Archaeological sites in Buckinghamshire
Archaeological sites in Hertfordshire
Long-distance footpaths in England
Protected areas of Wiltshire
Footpaths in Buckinghamshire
Footpaths in Hertfordshire
Footpaths in Oxfordshire
Footpaths in Berkshire
Chiltern Hills